Hindu Jagran Manch also Called as H.J.M (translation: Forum for Hindu Awakening) is an Indian Hindu activist group affiliated to the Rashtriya Swayamsevak Sangh (RSS). It focuses on activism against religious conversion and works for the reconversion of Muslims and Christians to Hinduism. It is said to have been founded by Vinay Katiyar in 1982. It first came to public attention for its activism and religious violence in the tribal areas of the Dangs district of Gujarat in 1998. It and other similar affiliates Hindu Jagran Samiti, Hindu Jagran Samaj and Dharm Jagran Samiti have been implicated in the aggressive Ghar Wapsi (reconversion to Hinduism) programmes in 2014–2015.

See also 
 Ghar Wapsi
 Agra religious conversions 2014

References 

Vishva Hindu Parishad
Sangh Parivar
Hindu organizations
Volunteer organisations in India
Far-right politics in India
Religious organizations established in 1982
1982 establishments in India